Titmouse may refer to:
Baeolophus, the genus of bird commonly known as titmice
Tit (bird), the European titmouse
 Titmouse, Inc., a U.S. animation studio
 Pointing stick, a style of computer mouse